Edvin Vesterby (born 23 October 1927) is a retired Swedish bantamweight wrestler. He competed at the 1952, 1956 and 1960 in freestyle and Greco-Roman wrestling and won a Greco-Roman silver medal in 1956. He finished fourth in the freestyle in 1952 and in the Greco-Roman wrestling in 1960. He was born in Riguldi Parish (now Noarootsi Parish), Lääne County, Estonia into a Swedish-speaking family. In 1943 he emigrated to Sweden and started wrestling in 1947 in Stockholm.

References

External links
 

1927 births
Living people
People from Lääne-Nigula Parish
Olympic wrestlers of Sweden
Wrestlers at the 1952 Summer Olympics
Wrestlers at the 1956 Summer Olympics
Wrestlers at the 1960 Summer Olympics
Swedish male sport wrestlers
Olympic silver medalists for Sweden
Olympic medalists in wrestling
Estonian emigrants to Sweden
Estonian people of Swedish descent
Medalists at the 1956 Summer Olympics
20th-century Swedish people